The 2009 Christy Ring Cup is the 5th annual second-tier hurling competition organised by the Gaelic Athletic Association. Eight county teams participate in the competition. The teams are Carlow, Derry, Down, Kerry, Mayo, Kildare, Westmeath and Wicklow.

The winning team was promoted to the All-Ireland Senior Hurling Championship 2010 and played for the Liam MacCarthy Cup.

On 11 July, Carlow retained the cup with a 1-15 to 0-14 victory over Down at Croke Park.

Structure
The tournament has a double elimination format - each team will play at least two games before being knocked out.
The eight teams play four Round 1 matches.
The winners in Round 1 advance to Round 2A.
The losers in Round 1 go into Round 2B.
There are two Round 2A matches.
The winners in Round 2A advance to the semi-finals.
The losers in Round 2A go into the quarter-finals.
There are two Round 2B matches.
The winners in Round 2B advance to the quarter-finals.
The losers in Round 2B go into the relegation playoff.
The losers of the relegation playoff are relegated to the Nicky Rackard Cup 2010.
There are two quarter-final matches between the Round 2A losers and Round 2B winners.
The winners of the quarter-finals advance to the semi-finals.
The losers of the quarter-finals are eliminated.
There are two semi-final matches between the Round 2A winners and the quarter-final winners.
The winners of the semi-finals advance to the final.
The losers of the semi-finals are eliminated.
The winners of the final win the Christy Ring Cup for 2009.

Knockout phase

Wicklow are relegated to the Nicky Rackard Cup 2010 competition.

Fixtures

Round 1

Round 2A

Round 2B

Quarter-finals

Semi-finals

Final

References

Christy Ring Cup
Christy Ring Cup